Emibetuzumab (INN) (LY2875358) is a humanized monoclonal antibody designed for the treatment of cancer. It is in phase II trials for patients with NSCLC

This drug was developed by Eli Lilly & Company.

References 

Monoclonal antibodies